Adriane Carr (born 1952) is a Canadian academic, activist and politician with the Green Party in British Columbia and Canada. She is also a councillor on Vancouver City Council. She was a founding member and the Green Party of British Columbia's first spokesperson (leader) from 1983 to 1985. In 1993 the Party formally established the position of "Leader". In 2000, she became the party's leader again. In the 2005 provincial election, she received in excess of 25% of the vote in her home riding of Powell River-Sunshine Coast. She resigned her position in September 2006 when she was appointed by Federal Green Party Leader, Elizabeth May, to be one of her two Deputy Leaders of the Green Party of Canada. Earlier in 2006, Carr had co-chaired the successful campaign to get her political ally and long-time friend Elizabeth May elected as Leader. 

After two losses as a federal candidate in Vancouver Centre (2008 and 2011), Carr was elected to Vancouver City Council in November 2011. She was the sole candidate of the Green Party of Vancouver for one of 10 seats in the at large election held in November 2011 municipal election. This was her first electoral success in eight attempts, and she was the first person elected under the Green Party banner to the council of a major Canadian city. She was re-elected in 2014. She continues to support the Green Party of British Columbia and the Green Party of Canada.

Early life
Carr was born in Vancouver and raised in the Lower Mainland and Kootenays. She earned a master's degree in urban geography from the University of British Columbia in 1980 and went on to a teaching career at Langara College.

Environmentalism
Carr was a co-founder in February 1983 of the Green Party of British Columbia, the first Green Party in North America, and worked as its unpaid Spokesperson (leader) from 1983 to 1985. She left teaching at Langara College in 1989 to work full-time for the Western Canada Wilderness Committee, having been a volunteer for that charitable society from shortly after it was co-founded by her later-to-be husband, Paul George and Richard Krieger. During her time working for WCWC, among other things, Carr led the organization's international campaigns and played a lead role in bringing together First Nations, environmental groups, logging companies and all levels of government in the successful campaign to establish a UNESCO Biosphere Reserve in Clayoquot Sound. From 1992 until 2000, WCWC (now called the Wilderness Committee) was led by a four-person committee of paid employees comprising Carr, her husband Paul George, activist Joe Foy and the organization's chief financial officer. Carr left the organization in 2000 to run for the leadership of the Green Party of British Columbia.

Politics

Carr has been the BC Green Party leader on two separate occasions.  She was the party's leader (although called a spokesperson because the Party did not have leaders at that time) in the 1983 provincial election, held shortly after the party's founding.  Carr ran in the two member riding of Vancouver-Point Grey, and finished last in a field of eight candidates with 1549 votes.  She also ran as a Green candidate for the Vancouver School Board in 1984, but after this, besides maintaining her membership, she had little further involvement with the provincial Green Party until the late 1990s. Although she and her husband Paul George returned briefly to active involvement in the late 1980s.

The Green Party of British Columbia was led from 1993 to 2000 by Stuart Parker (whom Carr endorsed during both of his runs for the party leadership in 1993 and 1997) and its ideological direction was largely guided by former members of the New Democratic Party during this period.  Carr emerged as a rival to Parker at the party's 1999 policy convention. The motion to vote on whether or not to call for a leadership contest without having to vote non-confidence in the leader was defeated by a substantial margin. But Parker was defeated in another non-confidence motion at an Annual General Meeting held in Squamish in March 2000. Parker resigned and interim Leader Tom Hetherington was selected by the new directors elected at that March meeting. A leadership contest was held and on 23 September 2000, Carr defeated Andy Shadrack and Wally du Temple to become party leader for a second time.

Parker and his supporters resigned from the party 31 July 2000, accusing the WCWC of attempting to manipulate the party's direction. Parker launched a formal complaint to Revenue Canada regarding WCWC's activities as a charitable society which was investigated by Revenue Canada and found to be groundless. Parker later encouraged Green Party supporters to vote NDP in the 2001 provincial election.)

Carr ran in the 2001 election in the riding of Powell River-Sunshine Coast, against former Liberal leader and then NDP cabinet minister Gordon Wilson. She was included in the Televised leaders' debate along with Liberal leader Gordon Campbell and Premier Ujjal Dosanjh. The Greens hoped to be viewed as a progressive alternative for voters. Carr finished third in her riding with 6316 votes (27%), against 6349 for Wilson (28%) and 9904 for victorious Liberal Harold Long.  The Green Party received 12.4% of the provincial vote in this election, a significant increase from its 2% total in the 1996 election. The party's largest number of votes was received in Saanich-Gulf Islands, one of only 17 constituencies that had been voting Liberal since 1991.

In 2004, Carr ran for the Greens in a by-election in Surrey-Panorama Ridge, held following the resignation of Liberal Gulzar Singh Cheema.  She finished a distant third with 8.4% of the vote as the NDP recovered to win the riding. This result was a harbinger of the party's decline in popularity in the 2005 general election, where its share of the vote fell to 9%.

Carr was a vocal supporter of a mixed member proportional (MMP) system under which some members are elected from constituencies like they are today and others are selected from party lists when needed to "top up" the legislature to ensure that the percentage of seats a party gets equals the percentage of popular vote it gets (similar to the system New Zealand adopted in 1993 and in Germany since the 50s). In 2002 she became the proponent of an Initiative under BC Recall and Initiative Act to hold a referendum on whether or not to adopt MMP in BC. Called the Free Your Vote campaign, it brought together a broad coalition of British Columbians and even included the official support of trade unions such as the BC Nurses' in a petition drive under the province's citizen initiative legislation. Despite having condemned this legislation as unworkable after an anti-grizzly bear hunting initiative by her husband, proponent Paul George failed to gather and submit sufficient signatures, Carr threw the energies into this campaign which, although it too failed to gather sufficient signatures in all but four ridings, The nearly 100,000 signatures gathered created the largest voting reform organization in the province and increased awareness and support amongst Greens and non-Greens alike for electoral reform. Many credit it with spurring the Liberals to establish a Citizens Assembly on Electoral Reform a few months later.

When the Citizens Assembly recommended an alternative Single Transferable Vote system, Carr felt strongly that this was the wrong system for BC stating: "It's rock bottom in terms of getting women elected. And it still leaves too many voters frustrated by their votes not counting. It's not truly proportional." However, after that initial outburst, Carr put her personal opinion aside and at the Green Party's Annual Convention following the Citizens Assembly's decision she supported a resolution that her party officially take a neutral stance letting candidates decide for themselves whether or not to support the Citizens Assembly's proposal. Almost all Green Party candidates actively campaigned for the electoral reform referendum in the 2005 election. Prior to that election Nik Loenen, "the father of electoral reform in BC" and a big STV supporter, had urged political parties not to take a stance. He felt in particular that the Green Party's endorsement might alienate potential supports in mainstream parties  Since the defeat of the BC-STV referendum in 2005 (58% – short 2% of the 60% level needed to pass) after a trip to Australia to see how STV worked there, Carr changed her view and supported the government-sponsored referendum on the BC-STV, as did the BC Green Party in the May 2009 general election.

In 2005, Carr was also included in the leaders debate, this time with Gordon Campbell and Carole James of the NDP.  She was expected to be strong competition in her riding of Powell River-Sunshine Coast, but finished third again with 25% of the vote (a decline of 2%), 14% behind the victorious NDP candidate.

At the annual Convention following the 2005 election, the Party conducted a confidence vote which included all members through a mail in ballot regarding Carr's leadership. She received over 85% approval in that confidence vote. The Party also adopted a schedule for regular leadership contests.

After successfully co-chairing a campaign to elect Elizabeth May as Leader of the Green Party of Canada, Carr resigned her position of Leader of the Green Party of British Columbia in September 2006 to become one of two deputy leaders of the Green Party of Canada appointed by her political ally and long-time friend Elizabeth May.  In January 2007, Carr was nominated to run in the federal riding of Vancouver Centre, running against Liberal Party of Canada incumbent Hedy Fry. That same year Carr bought a condominium in the West End and succeeded in getting the party to open up a regional office in BC at the Dominion Building, 301–207 West Hastings Street within the riding in February 2007 (relocated to suite 403 in the same building in December 2011). Her work for the federal party serving as the co-chair of the party's Shadow Cabinet, member of the national Campaign Committee and chair of the national Fundraising Committee.

Green Party of Canada currently share office space with the Green Party of Vancouver where Carr conducts her political work at 403–207 West Hastings Street, Vancouver BC V6B 1H7. 

In the 14 October 2008 federal election Carr ran in the Vancouver Centre riding. Hedy Fry was re-elected. Carr garnered 18.3% of the vote. Carr had the Green Party's fourth highest percentage of votes in the nation.

From 2009 until 2011 Carr served as the honorary co-chair of the Canadian Women's Voters' congress' non-partisan Women's Campaign School

In May 2011 Carr ran again in Vancouver Centre against incumbent Liberal Hedy Fry, getting 15.4 percent of the vote, coming in fourth.

On 19 November 2011, in the Vancouver City municipal election, as the single Green Candidate for one of the 10 Vancouver City Council Seats, Carr got 48,648 votes in the citywide at-large voting system. It put her in 10th place, 91 votes ahead of the person below her—enough to be elected. Carr was sworn in as a Councillor on 6 December 2011.

In the 2014 Vancouver City municipal election, Carr received the highest number of votes of any council candidate with 74,077 votes — 5,658 votes ahead of her closest competitor — and helped to create the largest team of elected Greens in Canadian history.

In the 2018 Vancouver municipal election, Carr was again elected with the highest number of votes and was joined by fellow Green Party members Pete Fry and Michael Wiebe on council. The Greens also elected three candidates each to the Vancouver School Board and Vancouver Park Board.

Election results

Notes

References

External links

 Green Party of Canada – Vancouver Centre Electoral District Association

1952 births
Canadian environmentalists
Canadian women environmentalists
Leaders of the Green Party of British Columbia
Living people
Female Canadian political party leaders
British Columbia political party leaders
Green Party of British Columbia candidates in British Columbia provincial elections
Green Party of Canada candidates in the 2008 Canadian federal election
Green Party of Canada candidates in the 2011 Canadian federal election
Women in British Columbia politics
People from Gibsons, British Columbia
Green Party of Vancouver councillors
Women municipal councillors in Canada
University of British Columbia alumni
21st-century Canadian women politicians
21st-century Canadian politicians